Cosimo Nocera (16 August 1938 – 28 November 2012) was an Italian international footballer who played as a forward.

References

External links

1938 births
2012 deaths
Association football forwards
Italian footballers
Italy international footballers
Serie A players
Serie C players
Calcio Foggia 1920 players